Bomet University College is a Constituent College of Moi University established under a Legal Notice Number 145 of 27 July 2017. Bomet University College is the first public University in Bomet County and is strategically placed at the heart of Bomet Town, Bomet County, Kenya.  Its establishment is a step towards the realization of a fully-fledged University in line with the government policy to establish at least one University in every County in Kenya.

The first cohort of GSSP students were admitted on 31 August 2016 to Bomet College and over the years the students’ population has grown to over 2,000. BUC in the initial stages started with five programmes of Moi University and this is envisaged to grow to 11 schools and five centres of research in the next five years. BUC endeavours to develop creativity and innovation to enable students to fit in the job market, by taking a practical approach to learning emphasizing the element of attachments and fieldwork in the training of its students and integrating ICT in their learning.

Controversies 
Between October 2017 and June 2019, there was an over-payment of KES 5.2 million to top members of management at the Bomet University College.

References

Universities in Kenya
Moi University
2017 establishments in Kenya